Berghülen is a municipality in the district of Alb-Donau in Baden-Württemberg in Germany.

Geography
The municipality  borders to the west and north to the town of Laichingen and to their districts Machtolsheim and Suppingen, on the east to Blaustein and on the south to the town of Blaubeuren.

Municipality arrangement
Besides the eponymous Berghülen, the municipality includes the two districts:
Bühlenhausen with 437 inhabitants. Incorporation on 1 January 1972.
Treffensbuch with 83 residents. Incorporation is not ascertainable.

History
The written history of the municipality Berghülen began with the first written mention of the district Bühlenhausen in a deed of the monastery Ochsenhausen, which was given to St. Blaise Abbey, Black Forest in 1100. Berghülen itself was in 1304 first mentioned in the documents with the donation of Count Henry of Tübingen to the monastery Blaubeuren. 1447 came all subsites together with Blaubeuren to the former county of Württemberg.
Both in the Thirty Years' War 1618–1648 and in the Nine Years' War 1688–1697 under general Ezéchiel du Mas, Comte de Mélac Berghülen was taken hard. In 1763 a large part of the town was burnt down by carelessness.
On 1 January 1972, the until then independent municipality Bühlenhausen was incorporated to Berghülen.

Politics

Council
The council in Berghülen has 10 members. The local elections on 25 May 2014 led to the following official results. The council consists of the elected honorary councilors and the mayor as chairman. The mayor is entitled to vote in the municipal council.
UL	Independent list – 53.2% = 5 seats 			
FL	Free list – 46.8% = 5 seats		
Poll – 64.4 %

Crest
The award of arms was on November 17, 1938, by the Reichsstatthalter Wilhelm Murr.
Blazon : "In a divided by wave section of gold and blue shield above a black deer rack, below a floating golden three mountain."
In the upper half of the shield recalls the black Württemberg deer that Berghülen became part of Württemberg by merging together with the current district Bühlenhausen in 1447. The lower half of the shield makes the coat of arms "talking", the three mountains are for the first, the shaft section and the color blue for the second part of the municipality name (hüle = village pond, livestock watering).

Crests Bühlenhausen
The right to use a coat of arms was awarded to the former community Bühlenhausen on 30 July 1953, by the Regierungspräsidium Nordwürttemberg
(Administration of North Württemberg). Blazon: "In divided blade, top in gold a horizontal black deer rack, below in red a silver lying wolf rod."
The Bühlenhausen emblem symbolises the black deer rack belonging to Altwürttemberg (Old Württemberg). The lying double hook, goes back to an old spot signs and the colours silver and red in the lower panel indicate the counts of Helfenstein.

Economy and Infrastructure

Companies
The largest employer in Berghülen is the fruit juice manufacturer Albi in Bühlenhausen.

Education
In Berghülen there is a primary and secondary school with Werkrealschule. More schools are available in Blaubeuren, in Laichingen, Gerhausen and in Ulm.

Points of interest

Museums
Carriage Museum in Bühlenhausen: the museum displays more than 100 coaches and carriages from the last two centuries.

Attractions
The "Pretty stone" in a valley east of Treffensbuch: a former landmark between the dominions of Ulm, Württemberg and Helfenstein. 
Huele in Bühlenhausen: it represents one of the last remaining Hülen in the Swabian Jura.
Hülenpfad of the municipality Berghülen (Hülen track)
Hay barn in Bühlenhausen

Regular events
Every year is in Berghülen the Maifest. It takes place on the first weekend of May with a concert event with groups of the rock scene, like Thomas D, Subway to Sally, Molotov (band).  
Every year in August takes place the traditional mutton running of the gunners club Berghülen 1923. Here a mutton is raffled to the participants.

The Württemberg Christus Union organizes annually a large soapbox race. The fastest box and the most creative box will be awarded.
Every year in December the Berghülen Advent evening takes place.	
Every 2 years the day of the trades is organized by the Commercial Association Berghülen in the commercial area.  
Every 3 years takes place in Berghülen the Fountain Festival, which is organized by the Swabian Alb Club from Berghülen.

Teams

Sports
The largest sports club in the municipality is the gymnastics and sports club. It was founded on 7 November 1931 and includes nearly 800 members in seven departments. These are: volleyball, football, chess, skiing, tennis, table tennis and gymnastics. 
In addition, there is yet another sports club, the shooting club Berghülen 1923.

Other teams
There are the following additional clubs and associations: Bund für Umwelt und Naturschutz Deutschland abbreviation BUND (Federation for Environment and Nature Conservation Germany), volunteer fire department, singing club, youth club, rural women, rural youth, trombones club, Swabian Jura Club, VdK (social association Germany VdK Germany).

Transportation
As part of the new Wendlingen-Ulm high-speed railway is considered the establishment of a new station Merklingen (Swabian Jura). Berghülen would finance part of the costs of the station.

Sons and daughters of the town
Hans Rösch (sen) (dates of life unknown), founded the Albi fruit juice company in 1928
Gottlieb Shepherd (* around 1910, died around 1940), sculptor

References

Alb-Donau-Kreis
Württemberg
Municipalities in Baden-Württemberg